Sanjiv Rai is a first-generation Indian innovator and serial entrepreneur. He is the Founder, Chairperson and Chief Solver of multiple startups under Billion Innovators and Chairperson at ARE Technologies and his venture initiatives AceWP Innovation Labs and BillionInnovators intend to promote innovation in India and abroad. As a serial Entrepreneur or Innovator he has worked on AI based convergence and design algorithms, on a variety of products and solutions such as network convergence enabling D5 chip, AceWP, PlasmaPHI, innovate2learn, agniie devices, ChazeMe, SmartSAPS(Smart Secured Automated Payment Solutions), coolATM and Rosenbridges Future Cities/Smart Buildings and CHANDRA project for NASA towards permanent human inhabitancy on outer planets.

Earlier years

Work 
Rai pioneered AI Convergence research since 2004/05 period including some early work in Quantum Communications for D5 Chip and developed AceWP Assessment tool at AreTec, which was launched in 141 countries. He has been a proponent of AI based automation since early days

Rai worked with NASA where he was the Chief Architect for the CHANDRA project. At Advanced Radio Engineering, Rai pioneered the D5 Chip technology, which enables neural network convergence in telecom devices with the in-built chip to access networks across multiple wireless standards at speeds of up to 100 Mbit/s.

He worked on AI network convergence since early days. Rai was considered a part of the next wave of millennial Entrepreneurs after Narayan Murthy and Azim Premji. Rai developed early versions of Virtual reality based learning tools for AceWP to simulate real-world wireless networks into an Augmented Reality lab environment for Engineering students. The program was compared with NNARTEand CISCO. Rai is working on six senses based augmented reality enabled labs and environments for K-12 education 

Rai owns several intellectual properties and has contributed to industry standards and books 

In 2004, Rai developed MogIA, an AI system that uses millions of data points from public platforms including Google, Facebook, Twitter and YouTube in the U.S. to make predictions. The AI system was named after Mowgli, a child in Rudyard Kipling's novel The Jungle Book. It has correctly predicted the winners of all four U.S. presidential elections since its inception, including the 2016 race when traditional polls had Hillary Clinton defeating Donald Trump 63 of 67 times in the four-week lead-up to Election Day. Rai said MogIA is a more accurate way to predict election outcomes because it does not "suffer from programmers/developer's biases." Instead, MogAI "aims at learning from her environment, developing her own rules at the policy layer and develop expert systems without discarding any data."

Education 

Sanjiv Rai started his education journey from a remote rural village that had no electricity  or enough classrooms to few of the best universities in the world. Rai graduated from the University of Calcutta and was offered admission in Engineering Doctorate in Electrical and Electronics Engineering at UCL, which Rai shelved aside in the pursuit of Innovation and Entrepreneurship. Rai is an alumnus of Harvard University. Rai collaborated on research with academia at IIT Bombay and on contract with Princeton University.

Opinions

Failure as a way of learning 
Rai believes that success is a bad teacher. Failures are important and essential steps of learning. Startups not having failed make unreasonable assumptions.

Future of education 
Rai has opined that the future of learning will be based on learning through six senses. Rai's body of work reflects that Augmented Reality can shape learning of the real world by leveraging all six senses and Artificial Intelligence can help learn several times faster and reinforce learning through AI based assessment tools.

Future of products from India 
Rai has been an early proponent of Innovation and Intellectual Properties driven products coming out of the Indian start-ups space instead of being me-too players or body shops. He emphasised areas such as Automation since 2004. Indian companies should diversify and do business across the world to balance unforeseen risks.

On product quality and customer focus 
Rai has been a proponent of Quality rigor and Customer focus in the products and services made.

On communication and information as a basic human right 
Rai has been a vocal advocate for access to communication and information as a basic human right, and humans as a civilized society have to do something about the widening digital divide.

Inhabiting outer space 
Rai believes that in the visible future, humans will be able to inhabit outer space as the population grows more digitally divided and sustainably large for Earth.

Awards and recognition
Recognition for Rai include being listed in the Marquis Who's Who,  being named among the Top 10 Emerging Stars by NASSCOM, Top 10 Asian Technovisionaries by ZDNet as part of CBS Interactive initiative and the Top 100 Disruptive Innovators by Red Herring. “Outstanding contributor to Engineering and Entrepreneurship” by ASEI.

Rai was selected as a Young Global Leader by the World Economic Forum in the year 2012.

Rai has chaired several tech committees and is active in creating global standards /leading initiatives at IEEE/ Computer Society/ Nanotechnology Council/GEOSS, ASQ-Electronics and Communications / Nanotechnology committee and WEF and is a celebrated speaker on Innovation. Rai has been invited to participate for his views on Innovation across the globe and to help shape Innovation agendas from Mexico to China and Africa

References 

Indian computer scientists
Living people
Year of birth missing (living people)
Indian company founders